Baskahegan Lake is a body of water in Washington County, Maine, United States. It is located in the town of Topsfield, Maine, the former township of Brookton (North Washington, Maine). The picturesque lake is known for its warm water fishery and very high water quality.

In 2007, Evergreen Wind Power LLC sought to build on Stetson Mountain, which would be visible from the boat launch on Baskahegan Lake near Brookton, nine miles away. As of 2009, the installation on Stetson Mountain was the largest wind power operation in New England.

References

Lakes of Washington County, Maine
Lakes of Maine